Soulshine is the fifth studio album by French DJ and recording artist DJ Cam, released in 2002.

Soulshine marks a departure from DJ Cam's regular sound, however the tracks still feature his trademark mix of hip-hop and jazz elements. As a whole, Soulshine is a cohesive collection of relaxed, lounge-type music. The jazzy, vibrant melodies (that incorporate for example flutes) are put on top of hard hitting, steady beats.

Soulshine features appearances from such American rappers as Afu-Ra and Gang Starr's Guru (credited as Baldheaded Slick). Keeping  it real came with the help of Cameo. The album features some female vocalists: the light, jazzy opening track "Summer in Paris" features Indonesian singer/songwriter Anggun.

Track listing
 Summer in Paris (feat. Anggun)
 Welcome To Soulshine
 Love Junkie (feat. Cameo)
 For Aaliyah
 Condor (feat. Baldheaded Slick)
To Be Continued
 Child's Play (feat. Filet of Soul)
 The Snow
 Bounce
 Soulshine (feat. Inlove)
 3/4 Interlude
 He's Gone (feat. China)
 Afu Ra Interlude
 Voodoo Child (feat. Afu Ra)
 Elevation (feat. Donnie)

Charts

References

2002 albums
DJ Cam albums